Nuevo Colón is a town and municipality in the Colombian Department of Boyacá, part of the subregion of the Márquez Province. Nuevo Colón borders Boyacá, Boyacá, Ventaquemada and Jenesano in the north, Tibaná and Turmequé in the south, Tibaná in the east and Turmequé and Ventaquemada in the west.

Etymology 
Nuevo Colón was first called Chiriví, after the name of the area in the time before the Spanish conquest, when it was inhabited by the Chibcha-speaking Muisca. Chiriví means "our". It received the name Nuevo Colón in 1907.

History 
Chiriví was part of the domains of the hoa of Hunza before the conquest. Conquistador Gonzalo Jiménez de Quesada passed through Nuevo Colón in 1537, when he was crossing the Tenza Valley to discover the emerald mines of Somondoco, on his way to Hunza. Chiriví, as Nuevo Colón was called, after the foundation of Tunja, became part of the encomienda of Gonzalo Suárez Rendón. Nuevo Colón was visited by the first evangelisers in 1556, the first church was constructed in 1776 and modern Nuevo Colón was founded on October 15, 1783. The colour orange in the coat of arms of the municipality refers to the skin colour of the indigenous Muisca.

Economy 
Around 80% of the economy of Nuevo Colón is based on agriculture of fruits. Main products cultivated are prunes, pears, apples, peaches, and the typical Colombian fruits curuba, tree tomato, papayuela, feijoa, granadilla and uchuva. Additionally potatoes, beans and maize are grown.

Gallery

References 

Municipalities of Boyacá Department
Populated places established in 1783
1783 establishments in the Spanish Empire
Muisca Confederation